The Australia women's cricket team were scheduled to play the South Africa women's cricket team in March and April 2020. The tour was scheduled to consist of three Women's One Day Internationals (WODIs), which formed part of the 2017–20 ICC Women's Championship, and three Women's Twenty20 International (WT20I) matches.

On 11 March 2020, South Africa named their squad for the WODI matches. However, the following day, Australia confirmed they would not be touring South Africa due to the COVID-19 pandemic, becoming the first major international series not to go ahead as planned due to coronavirus. It would have been the first time that the Australia women's team had toured South Africa for a bilateral cricket series.

Squads

Tour match

One-day match: TBC vs Australia

WODI series

1st WODI

2nd WODI

3rd WODI

WT20I series

1st WT20I

2nd WT20I

3rd WT20I

References

External links
 Series home at ESPN Cricinfo

2020 in women's cricket
2017–20 ICC Women's Championship
2020 in Australian cricket
2020 in South African cricket
International cricket competitions in 2019–20
South Africa 2019-30
Australia 2019-20
Cricket events postponed due to the COVID-19 pandemic